Kooteripattu is the developing village from India, located at Tamil Nadu state in Villupuram district.

Kooteripattu is the area connected with national highway road from Chennai to Trichy also roadlines to Pondicherry and Gingee.
Famous temples lord muruga mailam temple located on small hills. Mailam railway station is situated in kootteripattu, west from the road junction. There are two lakes in the village which meet together, from where the name of the village originated. Thiruvakarai goddess Vakrakalli temple located near Kooteipattu.
It is 20 km away from Pondicherry.

Villages in Viluppuram district